Shane Campbell (born June 24, 1994) is an American soccer player. He currently plays for Lansdowne Bhoys FC. Campbell is in his third year as a professional soccer player.

Career

Youth and college
Campbell grew up playing in the FC Delco Development Academy, captaining the club for 3 seasons.  Campbell also was selected to represent the Philadelphia Union Academy in the first years of the club's existence prior to their entry into the US Soccer Development Academy.  He played in the 2011 Generation Adidas Cup, as well as a friendly vs Everton's U-20 side. Campbell played soccer at Penn State University in 2012 and 2013, before transferring to Louisville University in 2014, where he stayed for two years.
Campbell also played with Reading United of the USL Premier Development League.

Professional
While playing in the academy system, Campbell was selected by Philadelphia Union Head Coach John Hackworth to play with the MLS side's reserve team.  Campbell made his professional debut in a 2–1 loss vs Toronto FC in May 2011. Campbell appeared in 8 reserve league matches for the Union, starting 7 of them. Campbell signed with United Soccer League side Harrisburg City Islanders in March 2016 after participating in preseason with the Philadelphia Union of MLS. After appearing in 18 games for the City Islanders, Campbell was transferred to in-state rivals Pittsburgh Riverhounds on November 23, 2016.

References

External links
Penn State bio
Louisville bio

1994 births
Living people
American soccer players
Penn State Nittany Lions men's soccer players
Louisville Cardinals men's soccer players
Reading United A.C. players
Penn FC players
Association football defenders
Soccer players from Pennsylvania
USL League Two players
Sportspeople from Lancaster, Pennsylvania
Pittsburgh Riverhounds SC players
Lansdowne Yonkers FC players